Margaritis Schinas (Greek: Μαργαρίτης Σχοινάς; ; born 28 July 1962) is a Greek politician and former civil servant. He took office in December 2019 as a vice-president in the Von der Leyen Commission with the portfolio of European Commissioner for Promoting our European Way of Life. A member of the New Democracy party, he previously was a Member of the European Parliament (MEP) from 2007 to 2009 and served as chief spokesperson of the European Commission from 2014 to 2019, and as a  deputy director-general of the European Commission's Directorate-General for Communication between 2015 and 2019.

Early life and education

Stemming from a family from Fourka, Chalkidiki, Schinas studied at Aristotle University of Thessaloniki, where he received a Bachelor of Laws in 1985. He went on to receive a Diploma of Advanced European Studies (DAES) in European Public Administration from the College of Europe in Bruges in 1986, as well as a further Master of Science in Public Administration and Policy at the London School of Economics in 1987.

In October 2011, he graduated from the EU-funded "High Potential Leadership" Program of the Harvard University School of Business.

European career

Schinas passed the competition for EU officials in 1989, and started working as a eurocrat in the Directorate-General for Transport of the European Commission and then at the European Commission Representation Office in Athens. From 1999 to 2004, he served as Deputy Chief of Staff in the office of Commissioner Loyola de Palacio, responsible for Transport, Energy and Relations with the European Parliament. From 2004 to 2007 Schinas was head of cabinet of the European Commissioner Markos Kyprianou.

Schinas became an MEP for the New Democracy party (which is part of the European People's Party), following the resignation of Antonis Samaras from the European Parliament on 25 September 2007. During his time in office, he was a member of the Committee on Budgets. He served until 2009 and was not a candidate in the 2009 European elections.

In 2010, Schinas was appointed Deputy Director of the Bureau of European Policy Advisers by Commission President Barroso. In April 2013 he was appointed Director at the Commission's Directorate-General for Economic and Financial Affairs.

In November 2014, he was appointed acting chief spokesperson for the European Commission, following a proposal from President Jean-Claude Juncker. On 16 December 2015, he was appointed Deputy Director-General of the Directorate-General for Communication of the European Commission.

Following the 2019 European election, Schinas was nominated to serve in the Von der Leyen Commission as the European Commission vice president for “Protecting our European Way of Life”, responsible for upholding the rule-of-law, migration and internal security. He became the first Greek to hold such a high-ranking position in the Europe's top decision-making body. His portfolio was later renamed into "Promoting our European Way of Life". Among this portfolio's thrusts is the European Commission coordinator on combating antisemitism and fostering Jewish life, held by Katharina von Schnurbein since 2015.

Personal life
He speaks Greek, English, French and Spanish. He is married to Mercedes Alvargonzález, a Spanish national, who was like him a student of the College of Europe in Bruges and works for the Secretariat of the European People's Party's Parliamentary Group and its President Manfred Weber. They have two sons, Stergios and John.

Schinas is an Aris Thessaloniki supporter.

In March 2020, Schinas was one of the few persons to participate in the start of the Tokyo 2020's Olympic torch relay - cancelled afterwards due to the COVID-19 crisis - in Olympia, Greece, as the third torchbearer after two olympic champions, Greek shooter Anna Korakaki and Japanese marathoner Mizuki Noguchi.

References

External links

 
 

1962 births
Alumni of the London School of Economics
College of Europe alumni
Greek European Commissioners
Living people
MEPs for Greece 2004–2009
New Democracy (Greece) MEPs
Politicians from Thessaloniki
European Commissioners 2019–2024